Kim Eun-ho (born 2 July 1996) is a South Korean cross-country skier. He competed in the 2018 Winter Olympics.

References

1996 births
Living people
Cross-country skiers at the 2018 Winter Olympics
South Korean male cross-country skiers
Olympic cross-country skiers of South Korea
Cross-country skiers at the 2017 Asian Winter Games
Competitors at the 2015 Winter Universiade